Kreg Battles is a Democratic member of the Indiana House of Representatives, representing the 64th District since 2006. In 2009, he was elected chairman of the House Committee on Elections and Apportionment Committee and Vice Chair of the House Standing Committee on Commerce, Energy, Technology, and Utilities. Due to redistricting, he was moved to the 45th district in 2012.

Battles has taught Math and Chemistry in the Vincennes Community Schools since 1983.

References

External links
Indiana State Legislature - Representative Kreg Battles Official government website
Project Vote Smart - Representative Kreg Battles (IN) profile
Follow the Money - Kreg Battles
2008 2006 campaign contributions

Democratic Party members of the Indiana House of Representatives
1958 births
Living people
People from Vincennes, Indiana
People from Washington, Indiana